Mường (Vietnamese: tiếng Mường) is a group of dialects spoken by the Mường people of Vietnam. They are in the Austroasiatic language family and closely related to Vietnamese. According to Phan (2012), the Mường dialects are not a single language, or even most closely related to each other, but rather are an ethnically defined and paraphyletic taxon.

Mường dialects are primarily spoken in mountainous regions of the northern Vietnamese provinces of Hòa Bình, Thanh Hóa, Vĩnh Phúc, Yên Bái, Sơn La, and Ninh Bình.

Mường has all six tones of Vietnamese; however, the nặng (heavy) tone is present only in Phú Thọ and Thanh Hóa provinces while in Hòa Bình Province, it is merged with the sắc (sharp) tone.

Writing system
Mường had no written form until Western academics in the 20th century developed a provisional alphabet based on a modified Vietnamese alphabet, including additional consonants like w and allowing different consonant pairs and final consonants than Vietnamese.

In September 2016, the People's Committee of Hòa Bình Province adopted resolution 2295/QĐ-UBND, specifying a new Mường alphabet to be used in instruction within the province. The alphabet consists of 28 letters and four tone marks. The provincial Communist Party of Vietnam newspaper, Hòa Bình điện tử began publishing its electronic edition in Mường in addition to Vietnamese and English, surprising some readers with the unusual orthography.

Phonology

Consonant inventory
The following table details the consonants of those dialects that show a full voiced-voiceless distinction in the stops (being Mường Bi, Mường Thành, Mường Động, and Ba Trại). The spelling is given in italics.
{| class="wikitable" style="text-align: center;"
|-
! colspan = "2" |
! Bilabial
! Alveolar
! Palatal
! Velar
! Glottal
|-
! colspan = "2" | Nasal
| m 
| n 
| nh 
| ng 
|
|-
! rowspan = "3" | Stop
! voiceless
| p 
| t 
| ch 
| c 
|
|-
! aspirated
| ph 
| th 
|
| kh 
|
|-
! voiced
| b 
| đ 
|
| g 
|
|-
! rowspan = "2" | Fricative
! voiceless
|
| x 
|
|
| h 
|-
! voiced
| v/w/o/u 
| d/gi/i/y 
|
|
|
|-
! colspan = "2" | Lateral
|
| l, tl 
|
|
|
|}

The Mường Khói and Mường Ống dialects have the full voiceless series, but lack  among the voiced stops. The Thạch Sơn dialect on the other hand lacks .

Furthermore, the Mường Khói dialect lacks the aspirated alveolar , but has a  instead.

All of these consonants can appear syllable-initially. At the end of syllables only the nasals , the voiceless stops , the lateral , and the glides  occur. Of these phonemes, the palatals  have been analysed as glide + velar . Furthermore, the distribution of syllable-final  seems to be more restricted than the distribution of the other final consonants.

Vowel inventory
The vowel inventory is given in the following table. It appears to be quite uniform among the different dialects. Two of the vowels ( and ) can be long or short.
{| class="wikitable" style="text-align: center;"
|-
! rowspan = "2" |
! rowspan = "2" | Front
! colspan = "2" | Back
|-
! unrounded
! rounded
|-
! Close
| i 
| ư 
| u 
|-
! Mid
| ê 
| ơ, â 
| ô 
|-
! Open
| e 
| a, ă 
| o 
|}

Apart from these monophthongs, there are also three diphthongs .

Tone
All Mường dialects are tonal. The Kim Thương dialect (Phú Thọ province) has been the object of an experimental phonetic study.

Vocabulary 

 Note two different romanisation are used to show Khmer here. (UNGEGN and Wiktionary Transcription)

References

Further reading
  (More)
Nguyễn, Văn Khang, Bùi Chi, and Hoàng Văn Hành. (2002). Từ điển Mường-Việt (A Mường-Vietnamese dictionary). Hà Nội: Nhà Xuất Bản Văn Hoá Dân Tộc.

External links

  online newspaper in Mường 

Vietic languages
Languages of Vietnam